East Cocalico Township is a township in northeastern Lancaster County, Pennsylvania, United States. At the 2020 census the population was 10,808.

History
Cocalico Township was divided into East Cocalico, West Cocalico, and Ephrata Townships in 1838. The Bucher Thal Historic District was listed on the National Register of Historic Places in 1987.

Geography
It contains the communities of Swartzville and Reamstown, and part of Stevens and Frysville.

Demographics

As of the census of 2000, there were 9,954 people, 3,461 households, and 2,709 families living in the township.  The population density was 482.9 people per square mile (186.5/km).  There were 3,557 housing units at an average density of 172.6/sq mi (66.6/km).  The racial makeup of the township was 95.76% White, 0.47% Black or African American, 0.11% Native American, 2.22% Asian, 0.03% Pacific Islander, 0.53% from other races, and 0.87% from two or more races.  1.38% of the population were Hispanic or Latino of any race.

There were 3,461 households, out of which 37.0% had children under the age of 18 living with them, 69.5% were married couples living together, 5.8% had a female householder with no husband present, and 21.7% were non-families. 17.3% of all households were made up of individuals, and 6.3% had someone living alone who was 65 years of age or older.  The average household size was 2.82 and the average family size was 3.21.

In the township the population was spread out, with 28.3% under the age of 18, 6.8% from 18 to 24, 30.6% from 25 to 44, 21.9% from 45 to 64, and 12.4% who were 65 years of age or older.  The median age was 36 years. For every 100 females, there were 100.3 males.  For every 100 females age 18 and over, there were 98.2 males.

The median income for a household in the township was $50,580, and the median income for a family was $55,401. Males had a median income of $38,833 versus $24,189 for females. The per capita income for the township was $21,387.  About 2.3% of families and 3.4% of the population were below the poverty line, including 5.2% of those under age 18 and 3.4% of those age 65 or over.

Recreation
A small portion of the Pennsylvania State Game Lands Number 274 is located along the eastern border of the township. East Cocalico Recreational Park is located on East Church Street off U.S. Route 222.

References

External links

 

Populated places established in 1732
Townships in Lancaster County, Pennsylvania
Townships in Pennsylvania